Iljaz Mirahori Mosque is a historic mosque in Korçë, Albania.

History

The mosque was built in 1494 and finished in 1496 by Iljaz Hoxha (also known as Iljaz Bey Mirahori), who was a veteran of the Istanbul Conquest and the city-founder of Korçë. According to the writer Sami Frashëri, it was built on the foundations of an existing monastery, then called dedicated to Saint Paraskevi (Kisha e Shën e Premtes). With its minaret being torn down during the Communist dictatorship, the Iliaz Mirahor mosque was declared a religious Cultural Monument of Albania. After the end of Communist rule in the 1990s, the minaret was not rebuild until 2014 in a slightly different style compared to the original one. The Ottoman Clock Tower of Korçë in front of the mosque has also been rebuilt afterwards.

References 

Mosques completed in 1496
Ottoman architecture in Albania
1496 establishments in the Ottoman Empire
Buildings and structures in Korçë
Mosques in Albania
Tourist attractions in Korçë